Slap Shot is a 1977 American sports comedy film directed by George Roy Hill, written by Nancy Dowd and starring Paul Newman and Michael Ontkean. It depicts a minor league ice hockey team that resorts to violent play to gain popularity in a declining factory town.

Dowd based much of her script, as well as several of the characters, on her brother Ned Dowd's playing experiences on 1970s minor league professional hockey teams.

While Slap Shot received mixed reviews upon release and was only a moderate box office success, it has since become widely regarded as a cult film.

Plot
In the fictional small town of Charlestown, Pennsylvania, the local steel mill is about to close permanently and lay off 10,000 workers, indirectly threatening the existence of the town's minor league hockey team, the Charlestown Chiefs, who are also struggling with a losing season and an increasingly hostile crowd. After discovering the hometown fans responding positively to an on-ice brawl with the opposing goalie, player-coach Reggie Dunlop goads his own team into a violent style of play, eventually letting the overly-aggressive Hanson Brothers, the club's recent acquisitions, loose on their opponents. The brothers' actively violent and thuggish style of play excites the fans, which increases revenue, potentially saving the team.

The team's new style produces unintended consequences that affect not only Dunlop, but the Chiefs' star player, Ned Braden, along with the rest of the team. Braden refuses to take part in the violent antics, as Dunlop attempts to exploit Braden's marital troubles in his efforts to get him to take part in the team's brawling, but to no avail. Several games degenerate into bench-clearing brawls, including one that takes place before the opening face-off, and another that brings the local police into the locker room to arrest the Hanson Brothers after they attack the opposing fans in the stands. Nonetheless, the Chiefs rise up the ranks to become contenders for the championship, and a rumor (started by Dunlop himself to further motivate his teammates) spreads that the team's success could possibly lead them to be sold to a buyer in Florida.

Eventually Dunlop meets team owner Anita McCambridge, and discovers his efforts to increase the team's popularity (and value) through violence have been for naught, as McCambridge's better option is to fold the team as a tax write-off. By the time Dunlop decides to abandon the new strategy of violence over skill, the Chiefs' main rivals in Syracuse have already upped the ante by stocking their team full of violent "goons" (many of whom were previously suspended from the league for flagrant violations) in preparation for the league's championship game. After being crushed during the first period while playing a non-violent style of "old time hockey," the disgusted general manager tells them that various National Hockey League scouts accepted his invitation to the game, as he was hoping that the Chiefs' habitual escapades would get the players signed to the major leagues.

Upon hearing this news, Dunlop decides to have his team revert to their previous violent approach, much to the joy of the spectators. When Braden witnesses his now-estranged wife cheering for the Chiefs, he realizes the absurdity of the violence, and adopts a similarly radical (but still non-violent) way of participation by performing a live striptease on the rink amid rousing cheers. When the Syracuse team's captain protests against this "obscene" demonstration and hits the referee for dismissing him, Syracuse is disqualified, granting the Chiefs the championship. After their win, and with the Chiefs now effectively folded and finished, Dunlop accepts the offer to be the player-coach to the Minnesota Nighthawks, bringing his teammates with him.

Cast

Development
The original screenplay by Nancy Dowd is based in part on her brother Ned Dowd's experiences playing minor-league hockey in the U.S. in the 1970s. At that time, violence, especially in the low minors, was a selling point of the game.

Dowd was living in Los Angeles when she got a call from Ned, a member of the Johnstown Jets hockey team. He gave her the bad news that the team was for sale. Dowd moved to the area and was inspired to write Slap Shot. It was filmed in Johnstown, Pennsylvania, Pittsburgh, Pennsylvania, and in central New York State (Clinton Arena in Clinton, New York; Utica Memorial Auditorium in Utica, New York; and the Onondaga County War Memorial Auditorium in Syracuse, New York).

Nancy Dowd used Ned and a number of his Johnstown Jets teammates in Slap Shot, with Ned playing Syracuse goon Ogie Ogilthorpe. He later used the role to launch a career as a Hollywood character actor, an assistant director and eventually a line producer. The characters of the Hanson Brothers are based on three actual brothers: Jeff, Steve and Jack Carlson, who played with Ned Dowd on the Jets. The character of Dave 'Killer' Carlson is based on then-Jets player Dave "Killer" Hanson. Steve and Jeff Carlson played their Hanson brother counterparts in the film. Jack Carlson originally was written to appear in the film as the third brother Jack, with Dave Hanson playing his film counterpart Dave 'Killer' Carlson. However, by the time filming began, Jack Carlson had been called up by the Edmonton Oilers, then of the WHA, to play in the WHA playoffs, so Dave Hanson moved into the role of Jack Hanson, and Jerry Houser was hired for the role of 'Killer' Carlson.

Paul Newman, claiming that he swore very little in real life before the making of Slap Shot, said to Time magazine in 1984: 

Newman stated that the most fun he ever had making a movie was on Slap Shot, as he had played the sport while young and was fascinated by the players around him. During the last decades of his life, he repeatedly called Reg Dunlop one of his favorite roles. Al Pacino wanted to play the role of Reggie Dunlop (#7) but director George Roy Hill chose Paul Newman instead.

Production notes

Yvan Ponton and Yvon Barrette (who played forward Jean-Guy Drouin and goaltender Denis Lemieux, the two Quebec players in the film) dubbed their own voices for the film's translated French version. The film is one of few mainstream American films that was translated in colloquial Québécois French and not Standard French. Heavy use of Quebec expressions and foul language has made this version of the film a cult classic among French-speaking Canadians, where lines from the movie such as "Dave est magané" ("Dave's a mess") and "Du hockey comme dans l'temps" ("good old-fashioned hockey") are common catch phrases.

The movie was filmed in (and loosely based around) Johnstown, Pennsylvania, and utilized several players from the then-active North American Hockey League Johnstown Jets (the team for which Dowd himself played) as extras. The Carlson Brothers and Dave Hanson also played for the Jets in real life. Many scenes were filmed in the Cambria County War Memorial Arena and Starr Rink in Hamilton, New York; the Utica Memorial Auditorium (used as Peterborough where the pre-game fight occurs and where a Hanson reprimands the referee for talking during the anthem); Onondaga County War Memorial in Syracuse, New York (used as Hyannisport where the Hanson Brothers charge into the stands to accost a fan and are arrested); and in other Johnstown locales. Coincidentally, the Johnstown Jets and the NAHL folded in 1977, the year Slap Shot was released.

Although much of the movie takes place during the fall and winter seasons, when hockey is in season, filming at the Utica Memorial Auditorium took place from June 3–4. Similarly, in Johnstown, Newman is wearing a coat as though it should be cold, but there is no snow on the ground and the trees are in full bloom.

The Reggie Dunlop character is based, in part, on former Eastern Hockey League Long Island Ducks player/coach John Brophy, who receives homage by his last name being used for the drunken center of the Hyannisport Presidents. Coincidentally, Brophy would later coach Dave Hanson, who played Jack Hanson, with the Birmingham Bulls in 1978.

In one scene announcer Jim Carr remarks that Ned Braden is "a college graduate ... and an American citizen!" – both unusual distinctions for a pro hockey player of the time. In real life, Michael Ontkean played hockey for and graduated from the University of New Hampshire in 1970.

Syracuse Bulldogs rookie goon Ogie Ogilthorpe, who was mentioned throughout the film but never actually seen until the final playoff game, was based on longtime minor-league goon Bill "Goldie" Goldthorpe. Like Ogie Ogilthorpe, Goldie Goldthorpe is also infamous for his rookie season in professional hockey (1973) when as a member of the Syracuse Blazers he amassed 25 major fighting penalties before Christmas.

The Blades in the film were based on the Broome Dusters. One scene in the film was specifically drawn from events that occurred in Binghamton, New York. In the movie the Hanson brothers wear black-rimmed, Coke-bottle eyeglasses, and in one game get into a fight immediately after the opening faceoff; in reality, both Jeff and Steve Carlson did wear that style of glasses, and did indeed get into a long fight right after an opening faceoff. Coach Dick Roberge:

A scene in the film shows the Hanson brothers jumping the Peterborough Patriots during pre-game warm-ups. This is based on events in a mid-'70s North American Hockey League playoff series between the Johnstown Jets and the Buffalo Norsemen. The Jets had a black player on their roster, and during a playoff game held in North Tonawanda, New York (a northern suburb of Buffalo where the Norsemen played their home games), a Norsemen fan held up a derogatory sign stating that blacks should be playing basketball. The next game in the series was held in Johnstown, and the Jets retaliated by attacking the Norsemen players during the warm-ups, with a huge brawl erupting.  The Norsemen players and coaches then returned to the dressing room and refused to come out to start the game.  The game was awarded to the Jets by forfeit, as was the playoff series since the "win" gave the Jets the needed number of victories to capture the series.

Another scene is also based on a real-life event. In the film Jeff Hanson scores a goal and is hit in the face by a set of keys thrown by a fan. The Hansons then go into the stands after the fan and Jeff Hanson punches out the wrong fan. After the game the Hansons are arrested for the incident. In real life a similar incident occurred in Utica, New York, in a game between the Johnstown Jets and the Mohawk Valley Comets. Jeff Carlson was hit in the face by a cup of ice thrown by a Utica fan and went into the stands after the fan with brothers Jack and Steve. All three were arrested and Dave Hanson gathered the money for bail for the Carlson brothers.

Reception
The film was a moderate hit upon release, grossing $28,000,000 over its theater run, which placed it at #21 among movies released in 1977 and well below the grosses of Paul Newman's three previous wide-release films: The Towering Inferno, The Sting, and Butch Cassidy and the Sundance Kid, which all grossed over $100 million.

Variety wrote that "director George Roy Hill is ambivalent on the subject of violence in professional ice hockey. Half the time Hill invites the audience to get off on the mayhem, the other half of the time he decries it. You can't really have it both ways, and this compromise badly mars the handsomely made Universal release, produced by Robert Wunsch and Stephen Friedman." Vincent Canby of The New York Times described the performances as "impeccable" and thought the film had "a kind of vitality to it," but found it "unfunny" and noted an "ambiguous" point of view with regard to violence. Kevin Thomas of the Los Angeles Times was negative, writing that since the "characters possess so little dimension and since we have so little opportunity to get to know and therefore care about them, their incessantly brutalizing behavior and talk can only seem exploitative in effect. What's more, in playing for laughs, Slap Shot gives the nasty impression of seeming to patronize both the players and their fans." Gary Arnold of The Washington Post wrote "Slap Shot comes at you like a boisterous drunk. At first glance it appears harmlessly funny, in an extravagantly foul-mouthed sort of way. However, there's a mean streak beneath the cartoon surface that makes one feel uneasy about humoring this particular drunk for too long." Tom Milne]of The Monthly Film Bulletin described it as "a film which, while deploring the incidence of violence in sport, does everything it possibly can to make the audience wallow in that violence."

Gene Siskel gave the film two-and-a-half stars out of four in his original print review, writing that "what Slap Shot does to its ultimate failure is exaggerate every one of its fine facets. It's as if those locker room tape recordings had been edited to remove the silences and banalities, to include only the most outrageous sex-and-violence. And regrettably, 'Slap Shot' moralizes about violence in its tacked-on, whipsaw ending. This, after filling the screen with nonstop mayhem." Years later he said, "My initial review was mixed and then I saw it two weeks later, thankfully, and I knew it was a terrific film." He included it among the runners-up on his year-end list of the 10 best films of 1977, explaining that "the more I saw it, the more I liked it."

The Wall Street Journal's Joy Gould Boyum seemed at once entertained and repulsed by a movie so "foul-mouthed and unabashedly vulgar" on one hand and so "vigorous and funny" on the other. Michael Ontkean's strip tease displeased Time magazine's critic Richard Schickel, who regretted that "in the dénouement [Ontkean] is forced to go for a broader, cheaper kind of comic response." Despite the mixed reviews, the film won the Hochi Film Award for Best International Film.

Pauline Kael in The New Yorker was mixed, writing that "I don't know that I've ever seen a picture so completely geared to giving the public 'what it wants' with such an antagonistic feeling behind it. Hill gets you laughing, all right, but he's so grimly determined to ram entertainment down your throat that you feel like a Strasbourg goose." However, she praised Paul Newman for giving "the performance of his life——to date."

Legacy
In the years since its initial release, Slap Shot has come to be regarded as a cult classic.

Critical reevaluation of the film continues to be positive. In 1998, Maxim magazine named Slap Shot the "Best Guy Movie of All Time" above acknowledged classics such as The Godfather, Raging Bull, and Newman's own Cool Hand Luke. Entertainment Weekly ranked the film #31 on its list of "The Top 50 Cult Films". In the November 2007 issue of GQ, Dan Jenkins proclaimed Slap Shot "the best sports film of the past 50 years."

On Rotten Tomatoes, the film has a rating of 83%, based on 35 reviews, with an average rating of 7.10/10 and the critical consensus stating "Raunchy, violent, and very funny, Slap Shot is ultimately set apart by a wonderful comic performance by Paul Newman."

Novelization
Concurrent with the release of the film, Berkeley Books released a novelization of the screenplay, written by Richard Woodley.

Sequels
The film was followed by two direct-to video sequels: Slap Shot 2: Breaking the Ice (2002) and Slap Shot 3: The Junior League (2008). Paul Newman and the rest of the original cast did not participate in either sequel, with the exception of the Hanson Brothers, who had major roles in both.

References

Bibliography

External links

 
 
 
 
 
 The Official Home of the Hanson Bros.
 The Charlestown Chiefs compared with the Johnstown Jets at ESPN
 Capturing the spirit of "Slap Shot" ...30 years later 
 Interviews with cast members about the 25th anniversary
 Part 1
 Part 2
 Where Are They Now: The Hanson Brothers
 Slap Shot (Then and Now) Filming Locations

1977 films
American sports comedy films
Films directed by George Roy Hill
Films shot in New York (state)
Films shot in Pennsylvania
American ice hockey films
Universal Pictures films
1970s sports comedy films
Films scored by Elmer Bernstein
1977 comedy films
1970s English-language films
1970s American films